Chinquapin Preparatory School is a nonprofit private college-preparatory school, grades six through twelve, which serves low-income youth, particularly minorities from the Greater Houston area. The school, accredited by the Texas Alliance of Accredited Private Schools, is located in Highlands in unincorporated Harris County, Texas, USA, near Baytown. 

Chinquapin Prep, along with Cristo Rey Jesuit College Preparatory of Houston and Yellowstone Schools (Yellowstone Academy), is one of the few Greater Houston private schools that caters to low income students.

History
The Chinquapin School was founded by Robert P. Moore — formerly head of the English Department at St. John's School in Houston and his wife Maxine. Incorporated in March 1969 as a school for boys, it was funded with a grant from The Brown Foundation of Houston. The Chinquapin School changed its name to Chinquapin Preparatory School in 2010. The school's motto is Quid pro Quo.

Admissions
In 2006 the school used a "summer tryout week" to judge prospective students, as there were more applicants than spaces.

Operations
 the school has boarding facilities which can take students in grades 6-12 of all genders; the school permits students in middle school to board if the school grants approval, and the boarding facility requires proof of a "demonstrated need" for girls in grades 6-7 and boys in grade 6. In 2006 the boarding facility was only for boys in the 7th and 8th grades, while girls of all grades and 6th grade boys were not permitted to use the boarding facility.

The school provides teacher residences on its property.

Funds given by private entities make up, as of 2006, the majority of the funds used by the school to operate.

Academics
In 2010, Chinquapin added the Urban Teaching Fellows Program, an initiative that allows recent college graduates to gain exposure to all aspects of life at a boarding school including teaching, coaching and residential life. 
All students who do not participate in team sports also take Physical Education. Piano, Guitar Ensemble, Studio Art, Journalism, and Drama are available as one-half credit electives for 9th-12th grade students. All students must take two half-credit courses in a Fine Art: Piano or Guitar (or other music options), Studio Art, Drama, and/or a Fine Arts elective.

Athletics
Chinquapin is grouped in TAPPS Division 2A and competes in basketball, bowling, cross country, soccer, tennis, track and field, and volleyball.

Notable alumni
Jarvis Johnson, member of the Texas House of Representatives
Nhial "Simon" Malia, a Lost Boy of Sudan

References

External links

 

Educational institutions established in 1969
High schools in Harris County, Texas
Private middle schools in Texas
Private schools in Greater Houston
Private high schools in Texas
1969 establishments in Texas
Private boarding schools in Texas